Malazgirt Mini UAV is a Miniature UAV produced by Turkish company Baykar.

It is named after the famous victory at the Battle of Manzikert in 1071.

Operators

References 

Unmanned aerial vehicles of Turkey